Kibatalia gitingensis is a species of plant in the family Apocynaceae. It is endemic to the Philippines.

References

Flora of the Philippines
gitingensis
Vulnerable plants
Taxonomy articles created by Polbot